Galeola faberi is an orchid species in the genus Galeola found in central and southern China, as well as in Nepal, the eastern Himalayas, Vietnam and Sumatra.

The phenolic compounds p-hydroxybenzaldehyde, 4,4'-dihydroxy-diphenyl methane, 2,4-bis(4-hydroxybenzyl) phenol, 5-methoxy-3-(2-phenyl-E-ethenyl)-2,4-bis (4-hydroxybenzyl) phenol (IV), p-hydroxybenzyl alcohol (V), 4-(beta-D-glucopyranosyloxy) benzyl alcohol (gastrodin), bis[4-(beta-D-glucopyranosyloxy) benzyl] (S)-2-isopropylmalate and bis [4-(beta-D-glucopyranosyloxy) benzyl] (S)-2-sec-butylmalate can be isolated from the rhizome of G. faberi.

References 

Orchids of China
Orchids of India
Orchids of Nepal
Flora of Sumatra
Orchids of Vietnam
Orchids of Yunnan
Myco-heterotrophic orchids
Plants described in 1896
Vanilleae